José Eugênio Corrêa (29 May 1914 – 28 January 2010) was a Brazilian bishop of the Roman Catholic Church. Corrêa was born in Lima Duarte, Brazil in 1914. On 26 October 1941 Corrêa was ordained a priest for the Archidocese of Juiz de Fora. He was appointed bishop of the Diocese of Caratinga on 19 August 1957 and was ordained on 10 November 1957. Corrêa resigned from the Diocese of Caratinga on 27 November 1978.

See also
Roman Catholic Diocese of Caratinga

External links
Catholic Hierarchy
Portal Caparao

1914 births
2010 deaths
Participants in the Second Vatican Council
20th-century Roman Catholic bishops in Brazil
Roman Catholic bishops of Caratinga